The 1996 Jiffy Lube 300 was the 16th stock car race of the 1996 NASCAR Winston Cup Series and the fourth iteration of the event. The race was held on Sunday, July 14, 1996, in Loudon, New Hampshire, at New Hampshire International Speedway, a  permanent, oval-shaped, low-banked racetrack. The race took the scheduled 300 laps to complete. In an emotional victory, Robert Yates Racing driver Ernie Irvan, who had recently came back from a near-fatal crash at the 1994 GM Goodwrench Dealer 400, would manage to dominate the late stages of the race to take his 13th career NASCAR Winston Cup Series victory, his first victory of the season, and his first victory in over two years. To fill out the top three, Robert Yates Racing driver Dale Jarrett and Rudd Performance Motorsports driver Ricky Rudd would finish second and third, respectively.

Background 

New Hampshire International Speedway is a 1.058-mile (1.703 km) oval speedway located in Loudon, New Hampshire which has hosted NASCAR racing annually since the early 1990s, as well as an IndyCar weekend and the oldest motorcycle race in North America, the Loudon Classic. Nicknamed "The Magic Mile", the speedway is often converted into a 1.6-mile (2.6 km) road course, which includes much of the oval. The track was originally the site of Bryar Motorsports Park before being purchased and redeveloped by Bob Bahre. The track is currently one of eight major NASCAR tracks owned and operated by Speedway Motorsports.

Entry list 

 (R) denotes rookie driver.

Qualifying 
Qualifying was split into two rounds. The first round was held on Friday, July 12, at 5:00 PM EST. Each driver would have one lap to set a time. During the first round, the top 25 drivers in the round would be guaranteed a starting spot in the race. If a driver was not able to guarantee a spot in the first round, they had the option to scrub their time from the first round and try and run a faster lap time in a second round qualifying run, held on Saturday, July 13, at 11:00 AM EST. As with the first round, each driver would have one lap to set a time. For this specific race, positions 26-38 would be decided on time, and depending on who needed it, a select amount of positions were given to cars who had not otherwise qualified but were high enough in owner's points.

Loy Allen Jr. was the only driver to fail to qualify.

Full qualifying results

Race results

References 

1996 NASCAR Winston Cup Series
NASCAR races at New Hampshire Motor Speedway
July 1996 sports events in the United States
1996 in sports in New Hampshire